Vidya Bhavan School was founded on 29th September 1969. The Primary School was started in June 1971 with standard one. Vidya Bhavan started the Higher Secondary Sections with Science and Commerce Sections in June 1981.Vidya Bhavan is a Minority Educational Institute managed by the Catholic Priests of the Diocese of Poona. 

All these sections of Vidya Bhavan are recognised by the Government Of Maharashtra and the medium of instruction is English.

Academics 
The school is divided into the pre-primary, primary, secondary and higher secondary sections. The school is affiliated to the Maharashtra State Board of Secondary and Higher Secondary Education. The 10th and the 12th standard students give the S.S.C. and the H.S.C. exams respectively each year.

References 

Primary schools in India
Catholic secondary schools in India
Christian schools in Maharashtra
High schools and secondary schools in Maharashtra
Junior colleges in Maharashtra
Education in Pune district
Educational institutions established in 1969
1969 establishments in Maharashtra